Joel J. Johnson (March 30, 1923 – April 6, 2009) is a former Democratic member of the Pennsylvania House of Representatives.

References

Democratic Party members of the Pennsylvania House of Representatives
1923 births
2009 deaths
20th-century American politicians
People from Martin County, North Carolina